Ramezan Kheder (April 10, 1944 – 1999) was an Iranian freestyle wrestler who won a silver medal at the 1974 World Championships. He competed at the 1972 and 1976 Summer Olympics and placed seventh and fifth, respectively. 

Kheder died after suffering from a kidney decease for several years. His statue was erected in his native Now Kandeh town.

References

External links
 

1944 births
1999 deaths
World Wrestling Championships medalists
Olympic wrestlers of Iran
Wrestlers at the 1972 Summer Olympics
Wrestlers at the 1976 Summer Olympics
Iranian male sport wrestlers
20th-century Iranian people